Hana Ann Lowry (born 23 April 2003) is an Australian soccer player who plays for Perth Glory in the W-League.

Early life
Lowry grew up in Western Australia and was spotted as a talented junior. She was one of 5 Western Australian players in the Australian squad for the 2019 AFC U-16 Women's Championship. She scored twice against Thailand, and another in the 3rd place playoff against China for a total of 3 for the tournament.

Club career
Lowry was selected in the Perth Glory squad for the 2019–20 W-League. She played several games off the bench, and was selected to start against Newcastle Jets. In this starting appearance Lowry scored her first W-League goal in a 4–2 victory.

References

External links
 Profile at Perth Glory FC
 

2003 births
Perth Glory FC (A-League Women) players
Australian women's soccer players
Living people
A-League Women players
Women's association footballers not categorized by position